gamma-Butyrolactone, γ-Butyrolactone (GBL) is a hygroscopic colorless, water-miscible liquid with a weak characteristic odor. It is the simplest 4-carbon lactone. It is mainly used as an intermediate in the production of other chemicals, e.g. methyl-2-pyrrolidone. In humans GBL acts as a prodrug for gamma-hydroxybutyric acid (GHB), and it is used as a recreational CNS depressant with effects similar to those of barbiturates.

Occurrence
GBL has been found in extracts from samples of unadulterated wines. This finding indicates that GBL is a naturally occurring component in some wines and may be present in similar products. The concentration detected was approximately 5 μg/mL and was easily observed using a simple extraction technique followed by GC/MS analysis. GBL can be found in cheese flavorings but typically results in a content of 0.0002% GBL in the final foodstuff.

Production and synthesis
γ-Butyrolactone is produced industrially by dehydrogenation of 1,4-butanediol at a temperature of 180–300 °C and atmospheric pressure in the presence of a copper catalyst.

The yield of this process is approximately 95%. The purification takes place with a liquid-gas-phase extraction.

In the laboratory, it may also be obtained via the oxidation of tetrahydrofuran (THF), for example with aqueous sodium bromate. An alternative route proceeds from GABA via a diazonium intermediate.

Reactions
As a lactone, GBL is hydrolyzed under basic conditions, for example in a sodium hydroxide solution into sodium gamma-hydroxybutyrate, the sodium salt of gamma-hydroxybutyric acid. In acidic water, a mixture of the lactone and acid forms exists in an equilibrium. These compounds then may go on to form the polymer poly(4-hydroxybutyrate) as well as the dimer 1,6-Dioxecane-2,7-dione. When treated with a non-nucleophilic base, such as lithium diisopropylamide, GBL undergoes deprotonation of the alpha carbon atom to the carbonyl. The related compound caprolactone can be used to make a polyester in this manner.

Polymerization 
The ring-opening polymerization of butyrolactone gives polybutyrolactone.  The resulting reverts to the monomer by thermal cracking. It is claimed that poly(GBL) is competitive with commercial biomaterial poly(4-hydroxybutyrate), or P4HB. It is further claimed that poly(GBL) is cheaper to make than P4HB, although both are bio-derived.

Uses
Butyrolactone is principally a precursor to other chemicals. Reaction with methylamine gives NMP, and with ammonia gives pyrrolidone. It is also used as a solvent in lotions and some polymers.

Butyrolactone, with its wide liquid range, chemical stability, and high dielectric constant, is used in electrolytic capacitors as the organic solvent. It is frequently mixed with a small ratio of ethylene glycol, "9:1" being common, to vary internal resistivity.

It has been used as a solvent in various laboratory experiments, e.g., the preparation of methylammonium lead halide.

Pharmacology

GBL is not active in its own right; its mechanism of action stems from its identity as a prodrug of GHB.

Pharmacokinetics
GBL is rapidly converted into GHB by paraoxonase (lactonase) enzymes, found in the blood. Animals which lack these enzymes exhibit no effect from GBL. GBL is more lipophilic (fat soluble) than GHB, and so is absorbed faster and has higher bioavailability. Because of these pharmacokinetic differences, GBL tends to be more potent and faster-acting than GHB, but has a shorter duration; whereas the related compound 1,4-butanediol (1,4-B) tends to be slightly less potent and slower to take effect but longer-acting than GHB.

Nutritional supplement

Due to its property of being a prodrug of GHB which increases sleep related growth hormone (GH) secretion, GBL was sold as a nutritional supplement after the scheduling of GHB, under the names Revivarant and Renewtrient, until they were banned by the FDA.

Recreational drug
GBL is a prodrug of GHB and its recreational use comes entirely as a result of this. GBL overdose can cause irrational behaviour, severe sickness, coma and death.

To bypass GHB restriction laws, home synthesis kits were introduced to transform GBL and/or 1,4-B into GHB.

GBL has a distinctive taste and odour, described as being comparable to stale water, synthetic melon aroma or burnt plastic. This differs significantly from GHB, which is described as having a decidedly "salty" taste.

Due to the fact that those with limited chemistry knowledge can make GBL with easy-to-get precursors, it has become quite popular among young people in French nightclubs.

Dangers 
If taken undiluted by mouth, GBL can cause esophageal and gastro-intestinal irritation. It is possible for oral ingestion of GBL to cause nausea and other similar problems, possibly more so than with GHB.

GHB has biphasic effects, an euphoric effect at low doses (the reason for the term liquid ecstasy), and a sedative effect at higher doses. As a result of this sedation it can cause unconsciousness. When combined with alcohol the increased sedation and risk of vomiting results in a high risk of fatality. Many harm reduction organisations suggest never mixing the two drugs as a result.

There have been news reports of several deaths associated with GBL, usually in combination with alcohol or other depressants.

Gamma-Butyrolactone is often referred to be used as a date rape drug.

Addictiveness and dependence
Frequent use of GHB or GBL, even when taken long-term and in moderate doses, does not appear to cause significant physical dependency in the majority of its users.  In many people, quitting or temporarily abstaining from use of the drugs is achieved with minimal or no difficulty.  However, when consumed in excessive amounts with a high frequency of dosing, physical and psychological dependence can develop. Management of GBL dependence involves considering the person's age, comorbidity and the pharmacological pathways of GBL.

GHB and GBL users can adopt a '24/7' dosing regime. This is where the user has become tolerant to the effects of the drug, increasing the dosage and frequency of dosage simply to avoid withdrawal symptoms.

For those users who do report withdrawal symptoms upon quitting the use of GHB or GBL, symptoms seem to depend on the dosage and the length of time the drug was used. Light to moderate users often experience insomnia and sleep-related problems, whereas heavy, prolonged use can cause severe withdrawal symptoms similar to Benzodiazepine withdrawal syndrome (BWS).

Dose
A milliliter of pure GBL metabolizes to the equivalent 1.65 g of NaGHB, the common form, so doses are measured in the single milliliter range, either taken all at once or sipped over the course of a night.

Legal status

Australia: GBL is not classified as a drug but as a health-endangering substance. Although legislation to enter into force on 1 April 2011 will make it possible to handle narcotics for industrial purposes will enable GBL and 1,4-Butanediol to be classified as controlled substances.

Canada: GBL is a Controlled Substance under Schedule VI of the "Controlled Drugs and Substances Act" in Canada.  Schedule VI of the "Controlled Drugs and Substances Act" requires vendors to collect information regarding purchases of GBL. The Act also prohibits the import and export of GBL into or out of Canada classifying it as either an indictable offense punishable with up to 10 years in prison or an offense punishable on summary conviction liable to imprisonment for up to eighteen months. It is not illegal for an individual to possess GBL in Canada.

Germany: GBL is not listed in the narcotics law, but its distribution is controlled. Possession is not illegal, but may be punished according to the Medicines Act, when intended to be sold for human consumption or synthesis of GHB. In recent years, an increase of GBL consumption has been observed due to the prohibition of GHB.

Hong Kong SAR: GBL is a dangerous drug controlled under Schedule 1 of the Dangerous Drugs Ordinance, Cap.134 (with exemption clause at Paragraph 16D).  Any person who is found to have in his possession of it not in accordance with this Ordinance can be liable, on conviction upon indictment, a fine of HK$1,000,000 and to imprisonment for 7 years.

Israel: GBL was classified as a proscribed substance from 2007.

Netherlands: GBL is unlike GHB not listed in the narcotics law, but its distribution is controlled. Possession is not illegal but may be punished according to the Medicines Act, when intended to be sold for human consumption or synthesis of GHB.

People's Republic of China: GBL was regulated as a Class III drug precursor since 7 June 2021.

Poland: GBL is classified as a drug. A license is mandatory for the manufacture, processing, reworking, importing, distribution of GBL.

Russia: GBL has been classified as a psychotropic substance since 22 February 2012. Its trafficking is limited, and non-licensed selling, buying or any other use is punishable by imprisonment up to 20 years.

Sweden: GBL is not classified as a drug but as a health-endangering substance. Although recently passed legislation to enter into force on 1 April 2011 will make it possible to handle narcotics for industrial purposes will enable GBL and 1,4-Butanediol to be classified as controlled substances.

United Kingdom: Because of their legitimate uses, regulation 4B of the 2001 regulations makes it lawful to import, export, produce, supply, offer to supply or possess GBL and 1,4-BD, except where a person does so knowing or believing that they will be used for the purpose of human ingestion.

United States: GBL is regulated as a List I controlled chemical. As a GHB analog, it is also treated as a controlled substance under Schedule I of the Controlled Substances Act if intended for human consumption.  Sales and distribution of this product for industrial use is tightly regulated and requires quantity tracing, lock and key storage and 24 hour surveillance and is limited to a very few suppliers who have appropriate DEA registrations and as of 2021 included only Ashland, BASF, and Miami Chemical.  Lyondell reportedly stopped commercial sales of this product due to increasingly tight regulations and liabilities but still makes it for internal and downstream production use. To purchase this chemical requires special DEA license and end use certificate approved and a site audit by DEA.

See also
 1,4-Butanediol
 Succinic anhydride

References

External links
 Erowid on GBL
 
 "All About GHB," a NIDA Neuroscience Consortium and OSPC "Cutting Edge" colloquium (27 June 2000 at the Doubletree hotel, Rockville, MD)

Sedatives
Gamma-lactones
Solvents
GABAB receptor agonists
GHB receptor agonists
Designer drugs
GABA analogues
Drug-facilitated sexual assault